William Tremblay may refer to:
 William Tremblay (writer), American poet and novelist
 William Tremblay (politician), member of the Legislative Assembly of Quebec for Maisonneuve